The Rock of the Three Kingdoms is a mountain of 1025 m of elevation in the Serra de Marabón, part of the mountainous system of Sierra de la Culebra.

Description and location

The Penedo is located on the border between the village of Moimenta in the municipality of Vinhais, the municipality of A Mezquita in province of Ourense (Autonomous Community of Galicia) and the municipality of Hermisende in Senabria comarca of the province of Zamora (Autonomous Community of Castile and León).  
There are Iberian wolves in this area.

See also
Tossal dels Tres Reis
Tripoint

References

External links 
 Penedo dos Três Reinos («The Rock of Three Kingdoms»)
Manzalvos - Orense
Treaty on boundaries between Spain and Portugal from the mouth of the Minho River to the junction of the river Cay a with the Guadiana. Signed at Lisbon on 29 September 1864

Mountains of Portugal
One-thousanders of Portugal